Josie Alice Quart,  (8 November 1895 – 17 April 1980) was a Canadian senator. A Progressive Conservative, she was appointed to the Senate of Canada on 16 November 1960 on the recommendation of Prime Minister John Diefenbaker. She represented the senatorial division of Victoria, Quebec until her death.

References 

1895 births
1980 deaths
Canadian senators from Quebec
Canadian Members of the Order of the British Empire
Politicians from Quebec City
Progressive Conservative Party of Canada senators
Women members of the Senate of Canada
Women in Quebec politics
20th-century Canadian women politicians
20th-century Canadian politicians